The Peace of Prague was a peace treaty signed by the Kingdom of Prussia and the Austrian Empire at Prague on 23 August 1866. In combination with the treaties of Prussia and several south - and central German states it effectively ended the Austro-Prussian War.

The treaty was lenient toward the Austrian Empire because Otto von Bismarck had persuaded Wilhelm I that maintaining Austria's place in Europe would be better than harsh terms for the future for Prussia since Bismarck realized that without Austria, Prussia would be weakened in a relatively-hostile Europe. At first, Wilhelm I had wanted to push on to Vienna and annex Austria but Bismarck stopped him and even threatened to resign and more drastically to hurl himself out of the fourth-story window of Nikolsburg Castle. Indeed, it was that relative cordiality with Austria that caused the clamouring factions of Europe in 1914 that led to the Great War.

Austria lost Veneto, which had been ceded to Napoleon III of France in the Treaty of Vienna, and he in turn ceded it to Italy. Austria refused to give Venetia directly to Italy because the Austrians believed to have crushed the Italians during the war. The Habsburgs were permanently excluded from German affairs (Kleindeutschland). The Kingdom of Prussia thus established itself as the only major power among the German states. The German Confederation was abolished. The North German Confederation had been formed as a military alliance five days prior to the Peace of Prague, with the north German states joining together. The Southern German states outside the Confederation were required to pay large indemnities to Prussia.

See also
Austro-Hungarian Compromise of 1867

References

1866 in Germany
History of Prague
Austro-Prussian War
1866 in Italy
1866 in the Austrian Empire
1866 in Prussia
Prague (1866)
Prague (1866)
Prague (1866)
1866 treaties
Treaties of the Kingdom of Italy (1861–1946)
Treaties of the Kingdom of Prussia
Treaties of the North German Confederation
Treaties of the German Confederation
19th century in Prague
August 1866 events